Jessica Robyn Bowman (born November 26, 1980) is an American actress known for her role as Colleen Cooper on Dr. Quinn, Medicine Woman.

Career
Bowman was born in Walnut Creek, California. She began acting in community theater and commercials, and appeared as Darcy on The Road Home.

After guest appearances on Boy Meets World, NYPD Blue, and Baywatch, Bowman assumed the role of Colleen Cooper on the popular drama Dr Quinn, Medicine Woman in season three, episode 15. She took over this role after the original portrayer, Erika Flores, did not renew her contract.  Bowman won the Best Performance by a Young Actress in a Drama Series at the Young Artists Awards in 1996 for her role as Colleen. She was also nominated in 1997 and 1998. She won the Michael Landon Award in 1996, along with Beth Sullivan, Tim Johnson, Chad Allen, and Shawn Toovey, for Outstanding Family Television series of the year. After Dr. Quinn was cancelled in 1998, Bowman starred in Someone to Love Me, playing a rape victim who struggles to prove her rapist's guilt.

Bowman appeared in two made-for-TV movies, Young Hearts Unlimited and Lethal Vows, before reprising her role as Colleen for the movie Dr. Quinn, Medicine Woman: The Heart Within in 2001. She appeared in the movies Joy Ride and Derailed, starring Jean-Claude Van Damme.

Filmography

Awards
1996: Young Artist Award: Best Performance by a Young Actress - TV Drama Series, Dr. Quinn, Medicine Woman
1996: Michael Landon Award: Outstanding Family Television Series of the Year, Dr. Quinn, Medicine Woman"

External links

References

1980 births
20th-century American actresses
21st-century American actresses
Living people
American child actresses
American film actresses
American television actresses
Actresses from California
People from Walnut Creek, California